Velká Dobrá is a municipality and village in Kladno District in the Central Bohemian Region of the Czech Republic. It has about 1,800 inhabitants.

Etymology
Velká Dobrá means literally "Great Good" or "Large Good". The name refers to "good water" or "fertile land". There were formerly two separate municipalities, Malá Dobrá and Velká Dobrá, earlier called Hořejší and Dolejší Dobrá (i.e. "Upper" and "Lower").

Geography
It lies in the Křivoklát Highlands.

History
There is evidence of human inhabitation in the region of Velká Dobrá since prehistory. A late 19th century archaeological investigation led by Josef Szombathy discovered a large middle Bronze Age (ca. 1200 BCE) grave site near the village in the forest of Hora. A monument constructed over 50 years stood over the largest grave mound. Around sixty graves were investigated, yielding bronze weapons, tools and utensils, several of which were sent for display at museums in Prague and Vienna.

The first written mention of Dobrá is from 1328, when two strongholds existed in the area, the lower at the site of the modern school on Komenského Square and the upper stronghold (still standing) at the junction of the main roads.

The longest ruling owners of the area were the noble families of Kladenský of Kladno (1412–1543) and Žďárský of Žďár (1543–1688). After that, the owners changed frequently. In 1548, Malá Dobrá had eight inhabitants and Velká Dobrá nine inhabitants. The area sustained extensive damage during the Thirty Years' War. After 1648, 6 out of 14 farms in Velká Dobrá were abandoned. Gradually, the number of houses and inhabitants increased. After 1700, the former upper defensive stronghold was converted into a granary.

In 1929, the Unhošť administrative district was abolished and Malá and Velká Dobrá became parts of Kladno District. In 1935, the municipalities of Malá Dobrá and Velká Dobrá were merged.

Demographics

Transport
The D6 motorway runs through the municipality.

Kladno Airport is located in the municipality. It is a public domestic civil airport.

Sights

A statue of John of Nepomuk dates from 1753. The Chapel of the Finding of the Holy Cross was built in 1765. In 1816, it was demolished and rebuilt in its current form.

Notable people
Václav Nosek (1892–1955), Communist politician, Minister of the Interior in 1945–1953
Tomáš Kaberle (born 1978), ice hockey player

References

External links

Villages in Kladno District